Herb Kehrl (1941/2 - 2005) was an American politician representing Michigan's 56th district in the Michigan House of Representatives from 2004 until his death in 2005.

Biography
Kehrl graduated in political science, history and sociology at Eastern Michigan University, and took a master's degree in history. He worked as a teacher of history, school principal and school administrator. In 2000 he entered the real estate industry, qualifying as a realtor in 2002.  He served as chair of the Monroe County Community Mental Health Authority and as Treasurer for Habitat for Humanity, and was a member of the Frenchtown Senior Citizen Board. He was elected as a Democratic representative in the 2004 Michigan State House Election for the 56th District, winning 49% of the vote against 47% for the Republican candidate John Manor.

Kehrl died of cancer on November 30, 2005.

References

2005 deaths
Deaths from cancer in Michigan
Eastern Michigan University alumni
Democratic Party members of the Michigan House of Representatives
1940s births
21st-century American politicians
20th-century American politicians